KLD Tunas Samudera is a two-masted schooner, or brigantine, of the Royal Malaysian Navy. Tunas Samudera was built by Brooke Yachts in Lowestoft, United Kingdom. She was laid down in 1988, launched in 1989, and christened by Queen Elizabeth II and the King of Malaysia. Tunas Samudera is a sail training ship with the Royal Malaysian Navy.

The vessel was designed by Colin Mudie of the Royal Designers for Industry, who was also responsible for sister ship Young Endeavour (operated by the Royal Australian Navy), and the sailing ships Tarangini (Indian Navy) and Lord Nelson.

She is involved in different Tall Ships' Races.

In 2007 and 2008, Tunas Samudera called in at several Europeans ports, including Cherbourg and Brest in France, during an around-the-world voyage with a crew of 46.

References

External links 
 Official Site Malaysian Navy

1989 ships
Schooners
Ships of Malaysia
Ships built in Lowestoft